Thomas Wood (born 14 January 1951) is an Irish street photographer, portraitist and landscape photographer, based in Britain. Wood is best known for his photographs in Liverpool and Merseyside from 1978 to 2001, "on the streets, in pubs and clubs, markets, workplaces, parks and football grounds" of "strangers, mixed with neighbours, family and friends." His work has been published in several books, been widely shown in solo exhibitions and received awards.

Life and work
Wood was born and brought up in County Mayo in the west of Ireland. His family left for England in his adolescence, when his mother, a Catholic, was forced away after marrying his father, a Protestant. He trained as a conceptual painter at Leicester Polytechnic from 1973 to 1976. Extensive viewing of experimental films led him to photography, in which he is self-taught. He has explored a "multiplicity of formally divergent themes and quotations" with an approach "much more fluid than the current conventions of post-Conceptual photography or photojournalism dictate". In 1978 Wood moved to Merseyside, and in 2003 to North Wales where he works as a part-time lecturer in photography at Coleg Llandrillo Cymru.

Wood photographed mainly in Liverpool and Merseyside from 1978 to 2001, primarily street photography "on the streets, in pubs and clubs, markets, workplaces, parks and football grounds" of "strangers, mixed with neighbours, family and friends." At the same time he also worked on a long-term study of the landscape in the west of Ireland, North Wales and Merseyside. He has returned to the west of Ireland every year since his family left. He has also worked with video on a daily basis since 1988, filming family life.

The pictures in Wood's first book and most famous series, Looking For Love (1989), show people up close and personal at the Chelsea Reach disco pub in New Brighton, Merseyside, where he photographed regularly between 1982 and 1985. This was followed by All Zones Off Peak (1998), which is described in The Photobook: A History vol. 2. All Zones Off Peak includes photographs from 18 years of riding the buses of Liverpool during his 1978 to 1996 'bus odyssey'—the images selected from about 100,000 negatives. People (1999), and the retrospective book Photie Man (2005), made in collaboration with Irish artist Padraig Timoney, followed. His work is included in the revised edition of Bystander: A History of Street Photography (2001).

Wood's first major British show, Men and Women, was at The Photographers' Gallery in London in 2012. His first full UK retrospective was at the National Media Museum in Bradford in 2013. His landscape photographs were exhibited for the first time in 2014.

The critic Sean O'Hagan has described Wood as "a pioneering colourist", "a photographer for whom there are no rules" with an "instinctive approach to photographing people up close and personal" and quotes photographer Simon Roberts saying Wood's photographs "somehow combine rawness and intimacy in a way that manages to avoid the accusations of voyeurism and intrusion that often dog work of this kind." Phill Coomes of BBC News wrote that "wherever they were taken or made, his pictures seem always to have a trace of human existence, and at their centre they are about the lives that pass through the spaces depicted." The New Yorker'''s photography critic, Vince Aletti, described Wood's style as "loose, instinctive and dead-on" adding "he makes Martin Parr look like a formalist".

PublicationsLooking for Love: Chelsea Reach. Manchester: Cornerhouse, 1989. .All Zones off Peak. Stockport: Dewi Lewis, 1998. . With an afterword by Mark Holborn.People. Cologne: Wienand, 1999. . English and German text.Tom Wood. Saar, Germany: Galerie im Buergerhaus Neunkirchen, 2000. . Exhibition catalogue. English and German text.Bus Odyssey. Ostfildern-Ruit, Germany: Hajte Cantz, 2001. . Exhibition catalogue. With an essay by Sylvia Böhmer. German and English text.Not Only Female…. Cologne: Schaden, 2004. . Exhibition catalogue. With an essay by Joerg Bader, "Broken English Working Class Hero", in English and German.Photie Man. Göttingen: Steidl, 2005. .F/M. Villeurbanne, France: 205. . English and French text. With a preface by Gilles Verneret and text by Durden Mark. Edition of 750 copies. A subset of photographs from Photie Man.Men and Women. Göttingen: Steidl, 2012. . A two volume collection.The DPA Work. Göttingen: Steidl, 2014. A two-volume collection, one on Rainhill Hospital in Liverpool (1988–1990) and one on Cammell Laird shipyard (1993–1996) in Birkenhead, commissioned by the Documentary Photography Archive.Termini. Guingamp, France: Gwinzegal, 2018. . With three short texts by Paul Farley.Women's Market. London: Stanley/Barker, 2018. . Photographs of the Great Homer Street market (Everton), 1978–1999. Edition of 1000 copies.101 Pictures. Bristol: RRB, 2020. Selected by Martin Parr, edited and sequenced by Padraig Timoney. Edition of 1500 copies.Snatch Out of Time. Tokyo: Super Labo, 2022.

Awards
Terence Donovan Award, Royal Photographic Society, Bath, 1998
Prix Dialogue de l'Humanite, Rencontres d'Arles, France, 2002

TV appearancesWhat Do Artists Do All Day? (BBC, 2014)

Exhibitions

Solo exhibitions
International Centre of Photography, New York, 1996.
The Museum of Modern Art, Oxford, 1998.
Gallery of Photography, Dublin, 1999.
Galerie im Buergerhaus, Neunkirchen/Saar, 2000.
Kunstverein, Ulm, Germany, 2000.
Suermondt-Ludwig Museum, Aachen, Germany, 2001.
Kasseler Kunstverein, Kassel, Germany, 2002. 
Stadtische Galerie, Wolfsburg, 2002.
Kunsthalle, Wilhelmshaven, 2002.Photieman, Castlefield Gallery, Manchester, 2003Sad Beautiful Life, C/O Berlin, Berlin, Germany, 2003.
Kunsthalle Bremen, Bremen, Germany, 2004.
Centre de la Photographie, Geneva, 2004.
Le Centre Cultural Suisse, Paris. Part of Paris Photo, 2004.
2005: Photieman, Le château d’eau, pôle photographique de Toulouse, Toulouse, France.
Foam Fotografiemuseum Amsterdam, Amsterdam, 2005.
2005: Looking for Love, Musée de l'Élysée, Lausanne, Switzerland (with Larry Sultan).
The National Museum of Photography, Copenhagen, Denmark, 2005.Men and Women, The Photographers' Gallery, London; Gallery of Photography, Dublin, 2013/2014.Tom Wood – DPA Work, Contemporary Art Space Chester, University of Chester, Chester, 2013. Photographs of Rainhill Hospital (1988–1990), commissioned by the Documentary Photography Archive (DPA), Manchester and made before the closure of the institution.Tom Wood – DPA Work, Contemporary Art Space Chester, University of Chester, Chester, 2013. Photographs of Cammell Laird shipyard (1993–1996) in Liverpool, commissioned by the DPA and made before the closure of the institution.Tom Wood: Photographs 1973–2013, 8 March – 16 June 2013. National Media Museum, Bradford, 2013.Landscapes, Oriel Mostyn, Llandudno, Wales, 2014. Curated by Mark Durden.

Group exhibitionsThe Sidewalk Never Ends: Street Photography Since the 1970's, Art Institute of Chicago, Chicago, IL, 2001/2002Photography Collection: Rotation 3, Museum of Modern Art, New York, 2006.Every Man and Woman is a Star: Photographs by Martin Parr and Tom Wood,'' Walker Art Gallery, Liverpool, 2013. With Martin Parr.

Collections
Wood's work is held in the following public collections:
International Centre of Photography, New York: 1 print (as of May 2019)
Art Institute of Chicago, Chicago, IL: 4 prints (as of May 2019)
National Photography Collection, National Science and Media Museum, Bradford
Walker Art Gallery, Liverpool
Deutsche Börse Photography Foundation, Frankfurt a. M.

See also
 Martin Parr
 Paul Graham

Notes

References

External links
Tom Wood: Making Sense, interview in Issue Magazine

Irish photographers
Street photographers
1951 births
Living people
Social documentary photographers